Buchteln (from Czech , pl. , also in German: pl., sing. ; also ,) are sweet rolls made of enriched yeast dough, filled with powidl, jam, chocolate, ground poppy seeds or quark, brushed with butter and baked in a large pan so that they stick together and can be pulled apart. The traditional buchtel is filled with powidl. Buchteln may be topped with vanilla sauce, powdered sugar or eaten plain and warm. Buchteln are served lukewarm, mostly as a breakfast pastry or with tea. In the 19th century they could be boiled similar to dumplings.

The origin of the buchteln is the region of Bohemia, but they also play a major part in the Austrian, Slovak, Slovenian, and Hungarian cuisine. In Bavaria buchteln are called Rohrnudeln, in Slovenian buhteljni, in Serbian buhtle or buhtla, in Hungarian bukta, in Kajkavian buhtli, in Croatian buhtle, in Polish buchta, and in Czech buchta or buchtička, in Lombard Buten. In Romania, in the Banat region, are called bucte.

See also 

 Gibanica
 Milk-cream strudel 
 Palatschinke

References

External links 

 Buchteln – sweet yeast dumplings, incl. recipe
 Bosnian buhtle recipe

Czech cuisine
Austrian cuisine
Slovenian cuisine
Bavarian cuisine
German desserts
Hungarian desserts
Sweet breads
Yeast breads
Foods with jam
Stuffed desserts